Altin Hoxha (born 21 October 1990) is an Albanian footballer who plays for Italian club Centese.

Career

Club career
In the summer 2015, Hoxha was set to sign with Italian Serie D club Fermana FC. Hoxha played two friendly games for the club and was offered a contract. While waiting for his work permit, Hoxha was training with his former club Teuta. However, he never got the work permit, why he signed with Korabi in 2016.

In the 2016-17 season, Hoxha returned to Italy, and played for Eccellenza club Montegiorgio Calcio. In the 2017-18 season, he played for Helvia Recina 1975. 

After two season at US Campagnola, Hoxha moved to Centese in July 2021.

References

External links
 
 
 

1990 births
Living people
Footballers from Durrës
Albanian footballers
Association football midfielders
Albanian expatriate footballers
Albania under-21 international footballers
KF Teuta Durrës players
Besa Kavajë players
Besëlidhja Lezhë players
KF Korabi Peshkopi players
Kategoria Superiore players
Kategoria e Parë players
Albanian expatriate sportspeople in Italy
Expatriate footballers in Italy